Azay may refer to the following communes in France:
Azay-le-Brûlé, in the Deux-Sèvres department
Azay-le-Ferron, in the Indre department
Azay-le-Rideau, in the Indre-et-Loire department
 Château d'Azay-le-Rideau, a chateau in Azay-le-Rideau
Azay-sur-Cher, in the Indre-et-Loire department
Azay-sur-Indre, in the Indre-et-Loire department
Azay-sur-Thouet, in the Deux-Sèvres department

See also 
 Azé (disambiguation)